Negro Creek is a stream in Delta County, Colorado, in the United States. It is a tributary of Tongue Creek.

Negro Creek was known as Nigger Creek until the name was changed in the 1960s.

See also
List of rivers of Colorado

References

Rivers of Delta County, Colorado
Rivers of Colorado